Alcester is a town in Warwickshire, England.

Alcester may also refer to:

 Alcester, Dorset, England
 Alcester, South Dakota, US
 Alcester Township, Union County, South Dakota, US, in the List of townships in South Dakota

See also
 Alchester Roman Town, Oxfordshire. England
 Algester, Queensland, Australia